Alutaguse Parish is a rural municipality in Ida-Viru County. The administrative centre is Iisaku.

Settlements
Boroughs
Iisaku, Mäetaguse

Villages
There are 73 villages:

Religion

References